Tasty Time with ZeFronk is an American animated series of three-minute long shorts produced for and aired on the Playhouse Disney block on Disney Channel from November 8, 2008, to September 24, 2010. Reruns aired on Playhouse Disney after the final episode of the series aired until February 13, 2011, when Playhouse Disney ended its run on Disney Channel. Reruns were later on moved to Disney Channel's Disney Junior block which debuted the next day at 6:00 AM Eastern Time. This animated short-form series is aimed at getting preschoolers to make their own snacks.

The series won a Daytime Emmy Award for Outstanding Special Class Short Format Daytime in 2011.

Summary
A French Dachshund called ZeFronk hosts a cooking show from his doghouse with his assistant, a songbird named Sue, and his silly neighbor cat named Dom that always sneaks away the snacks that ZeFronk makes, and each episode ends with ZeFronk chasing Dom around the prep counter, triggering Sue to fly away and come through the iris wipe. The first-season episodes ended with a bonus live-action segment in which a parent and child made the meal featured in the episode, although these segments were later removed due to time constraints.

Characters
 ZeFronk/Frankie (voiced by Rob Paulsen) is a French-accented Dachshund who has the talent of cooking.
 Sue is the assistant of ZeFronk. She is a songbird.
 Dom (voiced by Mark Hamill) is ZeFronk's silly Maine Coon neighbor who always steals the food (better referred as sneakingly eating) that ZeFronk makes. He faces bad consequences in the end such as being chased around by Zefronk.

Episodes

Season 1 (2008)
 "Dom's Tomato Surprise" (November 8, 2008)
 "Dom's Fishing Trip" (November 8, 2008)
 "Dom-ercise" (November 8, 2008)
 "Dom's Birthday" (November 8, 2008)
 "Two Sues" (November 8, 2008)
 "Cook Along with ZeFronk Contest" (November 8, 2008)
 "Best Chef in the World Award" (November 8, 2008)
 "Ze Pancakes" (November 8, 2008)
 "Dom's Retirement" (November 8, 2008)
 "The Surprise Package" (November 8, 2008)
 "Be Nice to Hot Cats Day" (November 8, 2008)

Season 2 (2010)
 "Ze English Tea Sandwiches" (July 19, 2010).
 "Ze Indian Mango Lassi" (July 22, 2010)
 "Ze French Mini Quiche" (September 20, 2010)
 "Ze Jamaican Coconut Banana Wheels" (September 20, 2010)
 "Ze Chinese Chicken Salad" (September 21, 2010)
 "Ze Italian Caprese Kabobs" (September 21, 2010)
 "Ze German Potato Pancakes" (September 22, 2010)
 "Ze Thai Watermelon Slush" (September 22, 2010)
 "Ze Mexican Quesadilla" (September 23, 2010)
 "Ze Greek Treat" (September 24, 2010)

References

External links
 

American children's animated comedy television series
American preschool education television series
2000s American animated television series
2010s American animated television series
2008 American television series debuts
2010 American television series endings
Television series by Disney
American flash animated television series
Animated television series about dogs
Animated television series about cats
Animated television series about birds
Disney Channel original programming
Disney Junior original programming
English-language television shows
Animated preschool education television series
2000s preschool education television series